Reger is a German surname, derived from the Middle High German reiger, meaning "heron", likely referring to a tall thin person. Alternatively, the name may originally have meant a lively or restless person, from the Middle High German regen, meaning "to be moved or excited". The name may refer to:

 Elsa Reger (1870–1951), German writer, wife of Max Reger
 Erik Reger (1893–1954), German writer
 Fred C. Reger (1916–1994), American politician
 Janet Reger (1935–2005), British businesswoman
 John Reger (1931–2013), American football player
 Max Reger (1873–1916), German pianist, conductor and academic
 Karl Reger (1900–1973), German physicist and author (Karl E. Reger), brother to Martin Reger
 Martin Reger (1909–1980is), German physicist, brother to Karl Reger

References 

German-language surnames